Orphanopusia osiridis is a species of sea snail, a marine gastropod mollusk, in the family Costellariidae, the ribbed miters.

Description
The length of the shell varies between 18 mm and 28 mm.

Distribution
This marine species occurs off Madagascar and Mozambique.

References

 Gori, S.; Rosado, J.; Salisbury, R. A. (2019). Costellariidae (Gastropoda) from Dhofar, Oman with descriptions of eight new species and notes on Vexillum appelii (Jickeli, 1874). Acta Conchyliorum. 18: 25-48.

External links
 Issel, A. (1869). Malacologia del Mar Rosso. Ricerche zoologiche e paleontologiche. Biblioteca Malacologica, Pisa. xi + 387 pp., pls 1-5

Costellariidae